Newburgh is a coastal village in Aberdeenshire, Scotland. The village dates to 1261 AD, when Lord Sinclair wanted to establish a chapel in the area. Originally built as a school, somewhat later the chapel of Holy Rood was established.

Geography

Newburgh is on the Ythan Estuary and near the Sands of Forvie. Near the estuary mouth, the presence of tern colonies is notable, since there are several distinct species that utilise the north banks of the Ythan Estuary, and comprise a meaningful percentage of the breeding pairs of terns in the United Kingdom. The Forvie Nature Reserve is very near and to the north, where there is said to be the largest eider duck colony in the world. Beside the beach is an eighteen-hole golf course with its bird shaped clubhouse and the Udny Arms restaurant.

History
During the nineteenth century, Newburgh was a main sea port for the nearby town of Ellon. A number of clipper ships sailed to destinations all over the globe to deliver tea and other cargoes and coal barges sailed up the east coast to offload at the quayside. Several of the wealthier clipper sea captains built houses in the village and named them after their most frequent ports of call. Hence several imposing properties exist in the village such as Shanghai house, Santa Cruz and Sydney house.

Newburgh was a victim of bombing in World War 2. Just past the eastern end of the Ythan Bridge, is a bomb crater left by an attacking German aircraft, the bomb, aimed at the wharf, skipped over the bridge and exploded on the embankment beside the Cruden Bay Road. Other bombs fell beside a mill at the south of the village (12 January 1942) and several dropped in the estuary whilst trying to attack buildings on the quayside.

A pillbox was located at the Ythan bridge; although this bridge has been demolished, the pillbox remains.

The beach was classed as a high invasion threat from German units based on Norway. A number of pillboxes along with barbed wire, anti-tank blocks and scaffolding poles (that ran almost to Aberdeen along the coast) were installed.

Landmines were also planted in areas between Newburgh estuary and Aberdeen, in December 2012 a landmine was found in the dunes. It's unclear how it got there, as the listed minefield were at Forvie and Menie. Mines have been known to be dragged along the coast by currents.

2005 saw a sudden expansion in housing in the village, with houses being built just west of the local school, and near the Ythan Hotel, at the southernmost point of the village. Whilst the houses at the west end of Newburgh were a marketing success, residents were fairly critical of the properties going up next to the Ythan, dubbing the area too swampy for the foundations.

Local information
Public Transport providing services to Aberdeen, Peterhead, Ellon and Dyce Airport are presently run by Stagecoach North Scotland. Also, not a quarter of a mile out of Newburgh is the aptly named Newburgh Motors garage. Education is served by Newburgh Mathers School, named after John Mathers who, just before his death, left the residents of Newburgh enough money to set up a school in the local area for, as he put it, the education and clothing of twenty poor fishermen's sons of Newburgh. In terms of secondary education, Newburgh is within the catchment area for Ellon Academy.The tallest point of Newburgh is the knoll Gallows Hill. The police station in Newburgh no longer exists: in its place stands a house. However, the presence of a cell, in the past, is given away by the bars in one of the windows. Also, in the front of the house are the words police station engraved in the stone.

Tourist attractions
The ruined Knockhall Castle is near Newburgh and was inhabited for a century by Clan Udny.

Coastal and country walks/cycling, bird watching, Sands of Forvie reserve (ducks, waders, seals and more), sea trout angling available. Newburgh on Ythan Golf Club – links course. Several other golf courses in easy reach. Wind/kite surfing in the area. Sand dunes and sandy beaches.

References

External links

Villages in Aberdeenshire